For the unincorporated community see Suwannee Springs, Florida

Suwannee Springs, once known as Suwannee Sulphur Springs is the site of natural springs and was a historic mineral spring tourist attraction and hotel in Suwannee Springs, Florida near  Live Oak, Florida. It is now managed by the Suwannee River Water Management District. The area offers swimming, hiking, and paddling opportunities.

At least six springs comprise Suwannee Springs, five spilling directly into the south side of the Suwannee River. The main spring flows inside a man-made wall fifteen feet high and three feet thick of limestone rock built in the late 1890s.

Suwannee Springs is a second magnitude spring with an average flow of 23.4 cubic feet per second (cfs).  The spring emerges from Oligocene age limestone and discharges hard, sulphur water.  The water maintains a year-round temperature of 70 to 76 degrees.

See also
 Suwannee River State Park
 List of Florida state parks
 Florida state forests

References

Further reading
Suwannee Valley Times article about the history of the springs with historic photographs of the site, hotel and cabins
Suwannee Springs – The Resort August 1, 2012 Memories of Florida

External links
YouTube video about the history of the springs

Springs of Florida
Protected areas of Suwannee County, Florida
Suwannee River Water Management District reserves
Bodies of water of Suwannee County, Florida